The World Unreal is the third studio album by Russian progressive rock band The Gourishankar, released at Russia on January 14, 2016 through ArtBeat Music.

Track listing 

All titles, writing credits, and song lengths taken from The World Unreal. All lyrics by Jason Offen Vocal melodies by Jason Offen and Nomy Agranson.

Line-up 

 Jason Offen – lead vocals, backing vocals
 Nomy Agranson – electric and acoustic guitars, fretted and fret less basses, keyboards, synths and programming, mandolin
 Svetoslav Bogdanov – drums and percussion

Session musicians 

 Evgeniy Ryabashev – violins on "Truth Stays Silent", "World Unreal"
 Leonid Nesterov – trumpets on "First Rush", "Truth Stays Silent" and "Pleasure and Suffering"
 Alena Sergeeva – classical vocals on "Truth Stays Silent" and "Pleasure and Suffering".
 Darina Popova – atmospheric female voice on "Intro - Fate"
 Maria Domashenko – space backing vocals on "Order and Chaos"
 Anna Popova – ethnic komi vocals on "Order and Chaos"
 Sergey Fedorov – backing vocals on "Order and Chaos"
 Ivan Tropnikov – backing vocals on "Time Follows"
 Arseniy Kadanev – children's voices on "Pleasure and Suffering"

Huge thanks go to our friend and colleague Doran Usher, who for years has devoted himself to work in The Gourishankar and without whom, the group would be unable to exist and develop. We wish success and a long and happy life for him and his family!

Some of the songs used ideas by Doran Usher.

Production 

 All music composed by Nomy Agranson
 All lyrics by Jason Offen
 Vocal melodies by Jason Offen and Nomy Agranson
 Drum lines by Svetoslav Bogdanov and Nomy Agranson
 Produced by Nomy Agranson and Jason Offen
 Executive producer – Nikolay ‘Big Nick’ Bogaychuk
 Mastering by Vladimir Ovchinnikov, Studio Mosfilm, Moscow, Russia, 2015

Recorded, engineered & mixed by Nomy Agranson at home and at Manaraga Recording Studios, Syktyvkar, Russia, between 2009 and 2015, except backing vocals for "Pleasure and Suffering. Part 2" and "Time Follows", recorded by Martin Brookes at Sol y Sonido Studios, Farajan, Spain, 2014.

2016 albums
The Gourishankar albums